Cleone may refer to:
Cleon, ancient Athenian statesman
Cleone (play), a 1758 work by Robert Dodsley
Cleone (engine), aircraft engine
Cleone, California, community in Mendocino County
Cleone (mythology),Naiad in Greek mythology